Helmut Oblinger (born 14 March 1973, in Schärding) is an Austrian slalom canoeist who competed from the early 1990s to 2015.

He won a bronze medal in the K1 event at the 2003 ICF Canoe Slalom World Championships in Augsburg. He also has four medals from the European Championships (1 gold, 1 silver and 2 bronzes). Oblinger also competed at five Summer Olympics, earning his best finish of fourth in the K1 event in Sydney in 2000.

His wife, Violetta, won a bronze medal in the women's K1 event at the 2008 Summer Olympics in Beijing.

World Cup individual podiums

1 European Championship counting for World Cup points

References

Beijing2008 profile

1973 births
Living people
People from Schärding District
Austrian male canoeists
Canoeists at the 1996 Summer Olympics
Canoeists at the 2000 Summer Olympics
Canoeists at the 2004 Summer Olympics
Canoeists at the 2008 Summer Olympics
Canoeists at the 2012 Summer Olympics
Olympic canoeists of Austria
Medalists at the ICF Canoe Slalom World Championships
Sportspeople from Upper Austria